Alice Belaïdi (born 18 March 1987) is a French actress. She has appeared in more than 20 films and television shows since 2010.

Theatre

Filmography

References

External links

 

1987 births
Living people
French film actresses
French television actresses
French stage actresses
21st-century French actresses
People from Nîmes
French people of Algerian descent